K700 may refer to:
Sony Ericsson K700, a model of mobile phone
Kirovets K-700, a model of heavy-duty tractor produced in former USSR and currently in Russia.